The 2022 edition of the Cinéfest Sudbury International Film Festival, the 34th edition in the event's history, took place from September 17 to 25, 2022 in Sudbury, Ontario, Canada. The lineup was announced on August 25.

Similarly to the 2022 Toronto International Film Festival, the event returned to primarily in-person screenings for the first time since the beginning of the COVID-19 pandemic in 2020, although a selection of films was still offered for home viewing on a virtual platform. Organizers indicated that they received an all-time record number of film submissions for inclusion in the festival.

Awards

Official selections

Gala Presentations

Special Presentations

Features Canada

Documentaries

World Cinema

Cinema Indigenized

Shorts

References

Cinefest
Cinefest
Cinefest
Culture of Greater Sudbury